Eduardo Iván Rodríguez Ramallo (born 7 April 1978 in Santa Cruz de Tenerife) is a former Spanish athlete specializing in the 400 metres hurdles. He competed at the 2004 Olympic Games reaching the semifinals.

His personal best in the event is 49.08 from 2004.

Competition record

References

1978 births
Living people
Sportspeople from Santa Cruz de Tenerife
Spanish male hurdlers
Olympic athletes of Spain
Athletes (track and field) at the 2000 Summer Olympics
Athletes (track and field) at the 2004 Summer Olympics
World Athletics Championships athletes for Spain